Garvaghy may refer to:

Garvaghy (civil parish), a civil parish in County Down, Northern Ireland
Garvaghey, a hamlet and townland in County Tyrone, Northern Ireland